Rosario de Vivanco (born 3 July 1949) is a Peruvian former freestyle swimmer. She competed at the 1964 Summer Olympics and the 1968 Summer Olympics. She was the first woman to represent Peru at the Olympics.

References

External links
 

1949 births
Living people
Peruvian female freestyle swimmers
Olympic swimmers of Peru
Swimmers at the 1964 Summer Olympics
Swimmers at the 1968 Summer Olympics
People from Piura Region
20th-century Peruvian women